The 1911 Haskell Indians football team was an American football team that represented the Haskell Indian Institute (now known as Haskell Indian Nations University) as an independent during the 1911 college football season. In its first season under head coach A. R. Kennedy, Haskell compiled a 4–2–3 record. The team played its four home games at Haskell Field in Lawrence, Kansas. Left tackle Willie Williams was the team captain.

Schedule

References

Haskell
Haskell Indian Nations Fighting Indians football seasons
Haskell Indians football